Tapinoma fragile is a species of ant in the genus Tapinoma. Described by Smith in 1876, the species is endemic to Mauritius.

References

Tapinoma
Hymenoptera of Africa
Insects described in 1876